Bresler is a surname. Notable people with the surname include:

Anton Bresler (born 1988), South African rugby union player
Jerry Bresler (1914–2000), American songwriter, conductor
Jerry Bresler (1908–1977), American film producer

See also
Bresler Pister yield criterion
Bresler's Ice Cream, American ice cream chain
Bressler, a surname